William Hatcher may refer to:

 William Hatcher (politician), Colonial American politician
 William S. Hatcher (1935–2005), American mathematician
 Will Hatcher (William Da Corean Hatcher), American basketball player